Seyed Naser Mousavi Largani is Falavarjan's representative in Islamic Consultative Assembly.

References 

Deputies of Falavarjan
1963 births
Living people